Pine Hollow is a valley in Oregon County in the U.S. state of Missouri.

Pine Hollow was so named for the pine trees that grow in the valley.

References

Valleys of Oregon County, Missouri
Valleys of Missouri